William Martin (21 June 1856 – 10 July 1938) was an Australian cricketer. He played one first-class match for Tasmania in 1877.

See also
 List of Tasmanian representative cricketers

References

External links
 

1856 births
1938 deaths
Australian cricketers
Tasmania cricketers
Cricketers from Tasmania
People from Westbury, Tasmania